Nikhil Seetharam is a multi-platinum Grammy winning Canadian composer and record producer from Toronto, Ontario. He has worked with several notable artists such as Drake, Kendrick Lamar, Nicki Minaj, and DJ Khaled. Nikhil composes film and television scores and has worked with companies such as Disney+, Hulu, BET, CTV, HBO and more.

Musical career

In 2010, Nikhil contributed production on Nicki Minaj's single "Moment 4 Life", which peaked at number 13 on the US Billboard Hot 100 chart.

2010
T.I. - No Mercy: 12. "Poppin Bottles" (feat. Drake) (produced with T-Minus)
Ciara - Basic Instinct: 9. "Turn It Up" (feat. Usher) (produced with T-Minus)
Nicki Minaj - Pink Friday: 7. "Moment 4 Life" (feat. Drake) (produced with T-Minus)

2011
DJ Khaled: We the Best Forever: "I'm On One" (feat Drake, Rick Ross, and Lil Wayne) (produced with T-Minus)
Drake - Take Care:
 09. "Make Me Proud" (feat. Nicki Minaj)

2012
Nicki Minaj - Pink Friday: Roman Reloaded:
 07. "Champion" (feat. Nas, Drake & Young Jeezy)

Tank - This Is How I Feel:
 00. "Compliments" (feat. Kris Stephens & T.I.)

Slaughterhouse - Welcome to: Our House
 12. "Frat House"

Kendrick Lamar - good kid, m.A.A.d city
 00. "Swimming Pools (Drank)"

T.I. - Trouble Man: Heavy Is the Head:
 08. "Go Get It"
 09. "Guns and Roses" (feat. P!nk)

ASAP Rocky - Long. Live. ASAP:
 03. "PMW (All I Need)" (feat. ScHoolboy Q)

2013

Drake - Nothing Was the Same:
 Bonus. "5 AM in Toronto"

T.I.
00. "My Potna"

Lil Wayne - I Am Not a Human Being 2:
09. "Rich As Fuck" (feat. 2 Chainz)

2014

Kelly Rowland - Talk a Good Game:
 Bonus. "Love me Til I Die'

Que - Can U Digg It?:
08. "Diamonds" (feat. August Alsina)

Nelly Furtado - TBD
00. Wild Side

2015

Marc E. Bassy - East Hollywood:
02. "XX"
03. "On Top"

2016

Chris Brown - Heartbreak on a Full Moon:
45. "Grass Ain't Greener"

Chris Brown & OHB - Before The Trap: Nights In Tarzana:
04. "I Need Love"

Filmography

2012

Searching for Angels - feature film (starring Vivica A. Fox and Veronika London)

2020

Utopia Falls - Hulu series created by R.T. Thorne & Joseph Mallozzi

2021

Good Trouble (TV series) - Season 3 - Freeform series created by Joanna Johnson, Bradley Bredeweg, Peter Paige. Composed with Amanda Jones

Twenties (TV series) - Season 2 - BET series created by Lena Waithe. Composed with Amanda Jones

A Black Lady Sketch Show - Season 2 - HBO series created by Robin Thede. Additional Music

2022

Children Ruin Everything - CTV/Roku series created by Chuck Tatham, Kurt Smeaton, Mark Montifore

Naomi (TV series) - DC Entertainment/Warner Bros. Television series created by Ava DuVernay. Composed with Amanda Jones

Good Trouble (TV series) - Season 4 - Freeform series created by Joanna Johnson, Bradley Bredeweg, Peter Paige. Composed with Amanda Jones

References

External links
 
 
 
 
 
 
 

Canadian songwriters
Living people
Male film score composers
Canadian hip hop record producers
Canadian film score composers
Year of birth missing (living people)